The 60th 500 Mile International Sweepstakes was held at the Indianapolis Motor Speedway in Speedway, Indiana on Sunday, May 30, 1976. Polesitter Johnny Rutherford took the lead on lap 80, and was leading when rain halted the race on lap 103. Two hours later, the race was about to be resumed, but rain fell again. USAC officials called the race at that point, reverted the scoring back to the completion of lap 102, and Johnny Rutherford was declared the winner. Rutherford famously walked to Victory Lane, his second career Indy 500 triumph, having completed only , the shortest official race on record. Janet Guthrie became the first female driver to enter the Indianapolis 500. However, her team was underfunded, and she experienced numerous mechanical and engine problems during the month. While she managed to pass her rookie test, and ran numerous practice laps in multiple cars, she was unable to make an attempt to qualify. She would return with a successful effort a year later in 1977.

Hours after the race, IMS Vice President Elmer George was shot and killed during a confrontation.  He had been in charge of the IMS Radio Network and was the son-in-law of IMS owner Tony Hulman. The confrontation was unrelated to the running of the race. In addition, 1976 would be the final Indy 500 for longtime radio anchor Sid Collins. After a surgery to repair a disk in his neck, Collins was still suffering muscular and neurological ailments, which made his work at the 1976 race physically difficult. He was later diagnosed with ALS, and committed suicide on May 3, 1977.

Rutherford's victory would be the final win at Indy for the venerable Offenhauser engine. It was the beginning of the end of an era which had seen 27 Indy 500 victories for the Offy powerplant.

The month of May 1976 was highlighted by the grand opening of the new Indianapolis Motor Speedway Hall of Fame Museum. Located in the track infield, the new museum replaced a much smaller facility on the corner of 16th Street and Georgetown Road. It was also the 30th anniversary of the first 500 under Tony Hulman's ownership, the 50th year since the incorporation of the Town of Speedway, and coincided with the year-long United States Bicentennial celebration.

Race schedule
On May 2, six days before the race cars took to the track, former Governor of California Ronald Reagan visited the Speedway. Reagan was in town campaigning for the 1976 Indiana Republican primary to be held on May 4. Reagan met with Tony Hulman, toured the Speedway, and drove around the track in one of the Buick pace cars.

Practice and time trials
The biggest story of practice was the appearance of Janet Guthrie, who was attempting to become the first female driver to qualify for the Indianapolis 500. Considerable media attention followed her through the month, however, the first two weeks of practice were plagued with various troubles. In addition, her participation was met with resistance by some fellow competitors. Upon her arrival at the airport, her flight lost her luggage (which included her helmet and driving suit). On the first day of practice, teammate Dick Simon was shaking the car down, but suffered an oil leak. On the second day, he burned a piston and had a turbocharger fire. Guthrie was unable to take to the track until Monday. Her first foray in the machine was short-lived, as she too burned a piston after only seven laps at speed.

On Tuesday, Guthrie started her rookie test, and despite low oil pressure and overheating, she made it through the first phase. On Thursday, she was trying to finish the second phase, but rain cut the run short. She finally completed her rookie test on Monday May 17, with a top lap of 171.429 mph.

Practice for the veterans was led by Johnny Rutherford, Al Unser and A. J. Foyt. In the third year of a rules package crafted to slow the cars down, there were no expectations of record speeds for 1976. Top speeds were in the high 180 mph range, with the best lap (189.833 mph) going to Rutherford. The existing track record (set in 1973) of 199.071 mph would stand for yet another year.

The most serious crash of practice was that of rookie Eddie Miller. He lost control coming out of turn one, and spun to the inside. The car hit an earth embankment, flipped over wildly, cleared two fences, then came to rest upside-down near the bleachers. Miller suffered a neck fracture, and would never return to Indy.

Pole day – Saturday May 15
Overnight rain delayed the start of time trials until 2:30 p.m. During practice, Johnny Rutherford finally broke the 190 mph barrier for the month, making him the favorite for the pole position.

At 3:30 p.m., Gordon Johncock (188.531 mph) put himself tentatively on the pole, and his speed would comfortably put him on the front row. About an hour later, Johnny Rutherford (188.957 mph) bumped Johncock off the top spot and would hold on to win the pole position. A. J. Foyt settled for fifth (185.261 mph), and Tom Sneva (186.355 mph) qualified for the outside of the front row.

Qualifying closed at 6 p.m. with nine cars in the field. Five drivers were still eligible for the pole round, however, none of those left in line were considered a contender for the pole. The day closed with the front row consisting of Rutherford, Johncock, and Sneva.

Second day – Sunday May 16
Only two cars that were eligible for the pole round made runs, and the field was filled to 11 cars. Moments later, the "second day" of time trials officially commenced. Mario Andretti, who had left Indianapolis to compete in the Belgian Grand Prix, dropped out of that race. Andretti would be back at the track soon, planning to put a car in the field on the second weekend of time trials.

Mike Mosley (187.588 mph) and Bobby Unser (187.520 mph) were the quickest of the day, but as "second day" qualifiers, they lined up 12th and 13th, respectively.

Third day – Saturday May 22
Mario Andretti returned to Indianapolis after competing in the Belgian Grand Prix. Andretti was expected to get up to speed quickly, and did not disappoint. His qualifying speed of 189.404 mph was faster than the pole speed, and Andretti became the fastest qualifier in the field. However, since he was a "third day" qualifier, he was forced to line up behind the previous days' qualifiers. On race day, he would start in 19th position.

A busy day of time trials saw the field filled to 33 cars at 5:37 p.m. The day ended with two cars bumped, and at least five drivers looking to make the field on Bump day.

Among those who did not make an attempt yet was Janet Guthrie. Still having problems finding speed in her #27 entry, her best practice lap of 173.611 mph was still too slow to bump her way in. A rumor was already circulating around the garage area that Foyt was going to lend her one of his backup cars (#1) – a car in which he practiced at over 190 mph on Friday.

Bump Day – Sunday May 23
The story of the day was Janet Guthrie, who arranged a deal with A. J. Foyt to borrow his #1 entry for practice. Shortly after 10 a.m., Guthrie was in the car shaking it down. Her lap of 180.796 mph was easily her fastest lap of the month. Despite her considerable gains in speed, Guthrie did not end up making an attempt to qualify.

As the afternoon was winding down, the attention shifted to the cars trying to bump their way into the field in the final hour. David Hobbs bumped his way in at 4:55 p.m. Eldon Rasmussen was now on the bubble. Rasmussen survived three attempts, but at 5:59 p.m., Jan Opperman took to the track. Opperman's run of 181.717 mph bumped Rasmussen from the field, and the lineup was set.

After creating a media and fan frenzy, Janet Guthrie left the track without making the field. With the spotlight still on her, she quickly found herself an alternative. Promoter Humpy Wheeler consummated a deal for Guthrie to acquire a car from NASCAR owner Ralph Moody, and within 48 hours, flew her to Charlotte to qualify instead for the World 600.

Starting grid

Alternates
First alternate: Eldon Rasmussen (#58) – Bumped

Failed to qualify
Bill Simpson (#38) – Bumped
Bobby Olivero  (#78) – Bumped
Jim McElreath (#65, #76) – Bumped
Mike Hiss (#11) – Spun during qualifying attempt
Bill Engelhart  (#44) – Waved off
Mel Kenyon (#61) – Waved off
Janet Guthrie  (#1, #17, #27) – Practiced, but did not attempt to qualify
Larry Dickson (#65)
Jim Hurtubise (#56)
Jerry Karl (#8)
Lee Kunzman (#65)
John Mahler (#19, #91, #92)
Rick Muther (#99)
Ed Crombie  (#67) – Wrecked during driver's test
Eddie Miller  (#46) – Wrecked during practice
Woody Fisher  (#52)
Gary Allbritain  (#75) – Entry declined

Race summary

Start
Race day dawned with blue skies and temperatures in the 60s. Rain was in the forecast for later in the afternoon. Tony Hulman gave the command to start engines at 10:53 a.m. EST, and the field pulled away for one parade lap and one pace lap. Country singer, and part-time NASCAR driver Marty Robbins drove the Buick pace car.

At the start, polesitter Johnny Rutherford took the lead into turn one, and led the first three laps. A. J. Foyt moved up to second, then passed Rutherford for the lead on lap 4. Back in the pack, Mario Andretti charged quickly from 19th starting position to 7th in two laps.

Moments later, Dick Simon blew an engine and stalled on the backstretch, bringing out the first caution. By lap ten, Simon, Spike Gehlhausen, Bill Vukovich II, and David Hobbs were all out of the race early with engine-related problems.

The green came back out on lap 7 with Foyt leading. On lap 10, Roger McCluskey lost control in turn three, hit the outside wall, then spun to the infield grass. Several leaders pitted under the caution. At lap 10, the top five was Foyt, Rutherford, Johncock, Sneva, and Dallenbach. A. J. Foyt was among those who went to the pits. As he pulled away, he snagged the crewman's wing adjuster, and he drove away with the long extension wrench still attached. Foyt was about to be black-flagged, but the adjuster fell off harmlessly. The debris lengthened the yellow light period for an additional three laps.

First half
Gordon Johncock took over the lead on lap 20, following Foyt's mishap. Johnny Rutherford ran second, and Foyt had dropped to third.

At lap 50, Johnny Rutherford was now leading, with Foyt second, and Johncock fading to third. Pancho Carter and Wally Dallenbach were running in the top five, with Tom Sneva close behind. Also climbing into the top ten was Salt Walther, in his best run at Indy thus far.

After running in the top ten early on, Gary Bettenhausen dropped out on lap 52 with a broken turbo wastegate.

Johnny Parsons lost a right front wheel on lap 60, bringing out the yellow. Rutherford had already made a pit stop, while  Foyt had not. Foyt was able to pit under the caution, and gained enough track position to take the lead for the restart on lap 65. This was ultimately to set the tone of the race, which ultimately became a "Texas shootout" between Dallas native Rutherford, and Houston native Foyt.

Foyt led Rutherford by about 9.5 seconds on lap 70. At that point, Rutherford began to close the gap. The sky was darkening, and rain was being reported in nearby Brownsburg. Rutherford charged to take the lead on lap 80, and began to pull away. At the same time, Foyt was beginning to suffer from handling problems.

Jerry Grant ran out of fuel on lap 91, bringing out the yellow. The green came back out on lap 95 with Rutherford first and Foyt second. Rain was quickly approaching. The yellow came out for drizzle on lap 100. On lap 103, the rain began to fall harder, and the red flag was displayed, halting the race. The race was stopped at approximately 12:42 p.m. local time.

Rain delay
The cars were parked in the pits and covered with tarps, with Rutherford leading and Foyt second. In order for the race to be ruled official, it had to complete one lap beyond the halfway point (101 laps). Since the race was on lap 103, it could be deemed official, and if the rains continued the rest of the afternoon, USAC could call the race at that point.

Since it was only 12:45 p.m., and with 97 laps still remaining, officials decided not to call the race prematurely. However, they did begin assembling the Victory Lane platform. By 1:15 p.m., it appeared that the rain had stopped, and track drying efforts were underway in earnest. About a half hour later, some light rain began to fall again.

Under the red flag, A. J. Foyt's team discovered a broken anti-roll bar linkage, and were able to make repairs. The team expected the car's handling to improve if and when the race was resumed.

At about 2:15 p.m., the rain had stopped, and the sun was shining through the clouds. With safety trucks and a jet dryer circulating, the track was almost dry. At 2:45 p.m., chief steward Tom Binford announced that the race will resume in about twenty minutes, and the focus shifted to the restart procedure. The decision was made to restart the race in single file, and give the field three or four warm up laps.

At 3:00 p.m. the call was made for the cars to line up in the grid, anticipating a restart. Some drivers began climbing into their machines.

Finish
With the cars lining up in the pit lane for a restart, observers around the circuit reported a dry track, but intermittent rain drops were falling at various locations. Some drivers were already in their cockpits. Soon after, umbrellas started opening up, and the rain began to fall harder around the track. Some fans began to look for cover, and the crews quickly covered up the cars again with tarps.

At roughly 3:15 p.m., the rain was falling harder, and the officials decided that the track was "lost." They judged there was not sufficient time left in the day to wait out the shower, dry the track once again, and complete the final 97 laps. At that time, they declared the race official. The scoring was reverted to the completion of lap 102, and Johnny Rutherford was declared the winner.

Before his crew was able to wheel the car to Victory Lane, Johnny Rutherford was surrounded by media and reporters, and famously walked to Victory Lane.

Box score

Race statistics

Legacy
Rutherford capped off a three-year stint with finishes of 1st-2nd-1st from 1974–1976, tied for the best three-year span in Indy history. It was equaled by Wilbur Shaw in 1937–1940 (1st–2nd–1st–1st), Al Unser in 1970–1972 (1st–1st–2nd) and by Hélio Castroneves in 2001–2003 (1st–1st–2nd).

As of 2020, the 1976 race is the shortest Indy 500 on record, completing only 102 laps (255 miles) out of the scheduled 200 laps. By USAC rule, the race was required to complete 101 laps – one lap beyond the halfway point – to be considered official and full points, unlike most motorsport that use a rule under the FIA Code requiring just three green flag laps for an official race with half points, and three-fourths distance for full points. It is also regarded as the "shortest" 500 mile race in a major U.S. series. Among other rain-shortened 500-mile races, the 2007 Pocono 500 went 106 laps (265 miles), the 2003 Daytona 500 went 109 laps (272.5 miles), and the 1987 Southern 500 went only 202 of 367 laps (276 miles) due to rain.

At one lap beyond official rate status, a 2002 NASCAR Xfinity Series race at Darlington Raceway is the shortest race with similar rules.  The 147-lap, 200.8 mile race won by Jeff Burton in August 2002 ran only to the minimum -- 74 laps. 

The 1976 race was the third race in four years (1973, 1975, 1976) to end rain-shortened. There would not be another rain-shortened Indy 500 until 2004. Rutherford's win from the pole was also somewhat trend-setting - only three other drivers had done so in the previous 22 years. In the next six years, the polesitter would finish either 1st or 2nd.

This was also the final 500 victory for the four-cylinder Offenhauser engine. Starting in 1977, the V-8 engines (from both Cosworth and Foyt) would start to make the four cylinder engine obsolete. 1980 was the real last hurrah for the engine, as the DGS version placed third with Gary Bettenhausen. No four-cylinder engine would qualify for the race beginning in 1981.

Broadcasting

Radio
The race was carried live on the IMS Radio Network. The network celebrated its 25th anniversary. Sid Collins served as chief announcer for the 25th time. Unbeknownst to all involved, 1976 would be the final Indy 500 for Collins. After a surgery to repair a disk in his neck, Collins was still suffering muscular and neurological ailments, which made his work at the 1976 race physically difficult. He was later diagnosed with ALS, and committed suicide on May 3, 1977.

This would be the third and final time Paul Page reported from the pit area. The following year he would be elevated to the chief announcer position. In addition, third-year veteran Jerry Baker would report from the backstretch for the final time, starting in 1977 he was a pit reporter. Bob Forbes served as the wireless roving reporter in the garages. The broadcast reached over 1,200 affiliates, including foreign language translations into Spanish, French, Italian, and Portuguese. It was picked up by Armed Forces Radio, and also transmitted to Japan, Central America and South America.

Collins customarily ended his broadcasts with "words of wisdom," vignettes, or a set-piece monologue for the listeners. His final broadcast was closed with the following sign-off quote:

Television
The race was carried in the United States on ABC Sports on a same-day tape delay basis. Jim McKay returned to anchor the broadcast, after sitting out the 1975 race. Analyst Jackie Stewart was absent from the broadcast, as he was in Monte Carlo for coverage of the Monaco Grand Prix, to be aired on ABC's Wide World of Sports the following weekend. Stewart, however, did record interviews during the month that aired during the Indy 500 broadcast. Stewart was paired with Keith Jackson at Monaco, the same pairing that had called the previous year's "500" on ABC in 1975. Former driver Sam Posey joined McKay at Indianapolis, his second time on the crew as booth analyst, and third year overall.

"Heavy Action" was used in an "Indianapolis 500" opening credits for the first time as Monday Night Football Producers Roone Arledge and Chuck Howard along with Directors Larry Kamm and Don Ohlmeyer also did work on this broadcast.

Notes

See also
 1976 USAC Championship Car season

References

Works cited
1976 Indianapolis 500 Press Information - Daily Trackside Summary
Indianapolis 500 History: Race & All-Time Stats - Official Site
1976 Indianapolis 500 Radio Broadcast, Indianapolis Motor Speedway Radio Network

Indianapolis 500 races
Indianapolis 500
Indianapolis 500
Indianapolis 500
May 1976 sports events in the United States